Various lists of the Wonders of the World have been compiled from antiquity to the present day, in order to catalogue the world's most spectacular natural features and human-built structures.

The Seven Wonders of the Ancient World is the oldest known list of this type, documenting the most remarkable man-made creations of classical antiquity; it was based on guidebooks popular among Hellenic sightseers and as such only includes works located around the Mediterranean rim and in the ancient Near East. The number seven was chosen because the Greeks believed it represented perfection and plenty, and because it reflected the number of planets known in ancient times (five) plus the Sun and Moon.

Seven Wonders of the Ancient World

The Greek historian Herodotus (484 – c. 425 BC) and the scholar Callimachus of Cyrene (c. 305–240 BC), at the Museum of Alexandria, made early lists of seven wonders. These lists have not survived, however, except as references in other writings.

The classic Seven Wonders were:

 Great Pyramid of Giza, in El Giza, Egypt, the earliest of the wonders to be completed, as well as the only one that still exists in the present day.
 Colossus of Rhodes, in the harbor of the city of Rhodes, on the Greek island of the same name.
 Hanging Gardens of Babylon, in Babylon, near present-day Hillah, Babil province, Iraq; or Nineveh, Mosul, Nineveh Governorate, Iraq.
 Lighthouse of Alexandria, in Alexandria, Egypt.
 Mausoleum at Halicarnassus, in Halicarnassus, a city of the Achaemenid Empire in present-day Turkey.
 Statue of Zeus at Olympia, in Olympia, Greece.
 Temple of Artemis at Ephesus, in the city of Ephesus, near present-day Selçuk, Turkey.

Lists from other eras
In the 19th and early 20th centuries, some writers emulated the classical list by creating their own lists with names such as "Wonders of the Middle Ages", "Seven Wonders of the Middle Ages", "Seven Wonders of the Medieval Mind", and "Architectural Wonders of the Middle Ages". It is unlikely that any of these lists actually originated in the Middle Ages since the concept of a "Middle Age" did not become popular until at least the 16th century and the word "medieval" was not invented until the Enlightenment era. Brewer's Dictionary of Phrase and Fable refers to them as "later list[s]", suggesting the lists were created after the Middle Ages.

Many of the structures on these lists were built much earlier than the Middle Ages but were well known throughout the world. Typically representative of such lists are:

Catacombs of Kom el Shoqafa, a 2nd-century funerary complex in Alexandria, Egypt.
Colosseum, a 1st-century amphitheatre in the centre of the city of Rome, Italy.
Great Wall of China, a series of defensive fortifications built across the historical northern borders of China, with some segments dating to as early as the 7th century BC.
Hagia Sophia, a 6th-century cathedral and mosque in Istanbul, Turkey.
Leaning Tower of Pisa, a 12th-century bell tower in Pisa, Italy.
Porcelain Tower of Nanjing, a 15th-century pagoda on the south bank of the external Qinhuai River in Nanjing, People's Republic of China.
Stonehenge, a Neolithic henge monument in Wiltshire, England dated to the 3rd millennium BC.

Other structures sometimes included on such lists include:

 Cairo Citadel, a 13th-century Islamic fortification in Cairo, Egypt.
 Cluny Abbey, a 10th-century Benedictine monastery in Cluny, Saône-et-Loire, France.
 Ely Cathedral, a (currently Anglican) cathedral originally built in the 11th century in Ely, Cambridgeshire, England.

Recent lists
Following in the tradition of the classical list, modern people and organisations have made their own lists of wonderful things, both ancient and modern, natural and artificial. Some of the most notable lists are presented below.

American Society of Civil Engineers

In 1994, the American Society of Civil Engineers compiled a list of Seven Wonders of the Modern World, paying tribute to the "greatest civil engineering achievements of the 20th century".

USA Todays New Seven Wonders

In November 2006, the American national newspaper USA Today and the American television show Good Morning America revealed a list of the "New Seven Wonders", both natural and man-made, as chosen by six judges. The Grand Canyon was added as an eighth wonder on November 24, 2006, in response to viewer feedback.

Seven Natural Wonders of the World

Similar to the other lists of wonders, there is no consensus on a list of seven natural wonders of the world, and there has been debate over how large such a list should be. One of many existing versions of this list was compiled by CNN in 1997:

Aurora, in the Earth's high-latitude regions (around the Arctic and Antarctic)
Grand Canyon, in Arizona, United States
Great Barrier Reef, off the coast of Queensland, Australia
Harbor of Rio de Janeiro, Brazil
Mount Everest, on the border of Nepal and China
Parícutin volcano, located in the state of Michoacán, Mexico
Victoria Falls, on the border of Zambia and Zimbabwe

New 7 Wonders of the World

In 2001, an initiative was started by the Swiss corporation New7Wonders Foundation to choose the New 7 Wonders of the World from a selection of 200 existing monuments through online votes. The Great Pyramid of Giza—part of the Giza Pyramids, the only remaining wonder of the traditional Seven Wonders of the Ancient World, was not one of the winners announced in 2007 but was added as an honorary candidate.

New 7 Wonders of Nature

A similar contemporary effort to create a list of seven natural (as opposed to man-made) wonders chosen through a global poll, called the New 7 Wonders of Nature, was organized from 2007 to 2011 by the same group as the New 7 Wonders of the World campaign.

*Iguazu Falls, on the border of the Argentine province of Misiones and the Brazilian state of Paraná
*Hạ Long Bay, in Quang Ninh Province, Vietnam
*Jeju Island, in the Jeju Province of South Korea
*Puerto Princesa Underground River, in Palawan, Philippines
*Table Mountain, overlooking the city of Cape Town, South Africa
*Komodo Island, one of the 17,508 islands that comprise the Republic of Indonesia
*Amazon rainforest, located in Brazil, Peru, Colombia, Venezuela, Ecuador, Bolivia, Guyana, Suriname, and French Guiana

New 7 Wonders Cities

New 7 Wonders Cities, a third list organized by New7Wonders and determined by another global vote, includes entire cities:

Durban, South Africa
Vigan, Philippines
Havana, Cuba
Kuala Lumpur, Malaysia
Beirut, Lebanon
Doha, Qatar
La Paz, Bolivia

Seven Wonders of the Underwater World

The list of "Seven Wonders of the Underwater World" was drawn up by CEDAM International, an American-based non-profit group for divers that is dedicated to ocean preservation and research. In 1989, CEDAM brought together a panel of marine scientists, including Eugenie Clark, to choose underwater areas which they considered worthy of protection. The results were announced at The National Aquarium in Washington, D.C., by actor Lloyd Bridges, star of TV's Sea Hunt:

*Palau
*Belize Barrier Reef, Belize
*Great Barrier Reef, Australia
*Deep-sea hydrothermal vents (worldwide)
*Galápagos Islands, Ecuador
*Lake Baikal, Russia
*Northern Red Sea, bordered by Saudi Arabia and Yemen on the eastern shore, and Egypt, Sudan, Eritrea, and Djibouti on the western shore

Seven Wonders of the Industrial World

British author Deborah Cadbury wrote Seven Wonders of the Industrial World, a book telling the stories of seven great feats of engineering of the 19th and early 20th centuries. In 2003, the BBC aired a seven-part docudrama exploring the same feats, with Cadbury as a producer. 

*SS Great Eastern, British oceangoing passenger steamship, launched in 1858
*Bell Rock Lighthouse, in the North Sea off the coast of Angus, Scotland, completed in 1810
*Brooklyn Bridge, in New York City, New York, United States, opened to traffic in 1883
*London sewerage system, serving London, England since the late 19th century
*First transcontinental railroad,  continuous railroad line connecting existing rail networks in Iowa, Nebraska, Wyoming, Utah, Nevada, and California in the United States, completed in 1869
*Panama Canal,  artificial waterway crossing the Isthmus of Panama and connecting the Atlantic and Pacific oceans, completed in 1914
*Hoover Dam, on the Colorado River, spanning the border between Nevada and Arizona in the United States, completed in 1936

Seven Wonders of the Solar System

In a 1999 article, Astronomy magazine listed the "Seven Wonders of the Solar System".  This article was later made into a video.

Enceladus, a moon of Saturn
The Great Red Spot of Jupiter, a massive and persistent anticyclonic storm in the planet's southern hemisphere
The asteroid belt, a region of innumerable small solid bodies located between the orbits of Mars and Jupiter
 The surface of the Sun
 The oceans of Earth
 The Rings of Saturn
 Olympus Mons, an enormous shield volcano on Mars and the tallest planetary mountain in the Solar System

Other lists of wonders of the world
Many authors and organisations have composed lists of the wonders of the world that have been published in book or magazine form.

Seven Wonders of the World is a 1956 film in which Lowell Thomas searches the world for natural and artificial wonders and invites the audience to try to update the ancient Wonders of the World list.

See also
 Eighth Wonder of the World
 National Seven Wonders
 Seven Wonders of Canada
 Seven Wonders of Colombia
 Seven Wonders of Poland
 Seven Wonders of Portugal
 Seven Natural Wonders of Romania
 Seven Wonders of Romania
 Seven Wonders of Russia
 Seven Wonders of Ukraine
 Seven Wonders of Wales
 Seven Wonders of Dauphiné
 12 Treasures of Spain
 Seven Wonders of Fore (Fore Abbey, Ireland)
 World Heritage List – a list of over 900 sites deemed by UNESCO to be of "outstanding universal value"
 Seven Horticultural Wonders of the World

Notes

References

External links

 77 Wonders of the World in 360° A list of world wonders linking the ancient 7 Wonders of the World and the World Heritage List by UNESCO

Cultural lists